Spencer Tracy (1900–1967) was an American actor. He appeared in 75 films from 1930 to 1967, during which time he received several awards and nominations from the industry. He was nominated for nine Academy Awards for Best Actor, a record he holds with Laurence Olivier, and won two, for Captains Courageous (1937) and Boys Town (1938). He was the first person to win consecutive awards in the Best Actor category, and this would not be matched until Tom Hanks received consecutive Best Actor awards in 1993 and 1994. Tracy received five British Academy Film Award nominations for Best Actor in a Leading Role and four Golden Globe Award nominations for Best Actor – Motion Picture Drama. He won each of those awards once. He was also the recipient of the Best Actor prize at the Cannes Film Festival, and the National Board of Review Award for Best Actor.

Awards and nominations

Academy Awards

BAFTA Award

Golden Globe

Cannes Film Festival

See also

Spencer Tracy filmography

References

Tracy, Spencer